Kawatsu (written: 川津 or 河津) is a Japanese surname. Notable people with the surname include:

, Japanese swimmer
, Japanese fencer

Japanese-language surnames